The 1888 United States presidential election in Rhode Island took place on November 6, 1888, as part of the 1888 United States presidential election. Voters chose four representatives, or electors to the Electoral College, who voted for president and vice president.

Rhode Island voted for the Republican nominee, Benjamin Harrison, over the Democratic nominee, incumbent President Grover Cleveland. Harrison won the state by a margin of 10.89%.

Results

See also
 United States presidential elections in Rhode Island

References

Rhode Island
1888
1888 Rhode Island elections